Carlos Wellington de Castro Bezerra (born September 27, 1970) is a Brazilian teacher and politician. He is the founder of the Curso Wellington (founded in October 1995 as Curso do Sargento Wellington) and state deputy (2015–present). Endorsed by Roseana Sarney, Wellington ran the mayor of São Luís, but not was elected. Wellington endorsed Eduardo Braide, also defeated by Edivaldo Holanda Junior.

References 

Progressistas politicians
Party of the Brazilian Woman politicians
Cidadania politicians
Social Liberal Party (Brazil) politicians
People from Teresina
1970 births
Living people